The 2nd Women's Chess Olympiad, organized by the FIDE, took place between 22 September and 12 October, 1963, in Split, SFR Yugoslavia.

Results
A total of 15 two-woman teams entered the competition. It was played as a round-robin tournament.

{| class="wikitable"
! # !!Country !! Players !! Points !! MP
|-
| style="background:gold;"|1 ||  || Nona Gaprindashvili, Tatiana Zatulovskaya, Kira Zvorykina|| 25 || 
|-
| style="background:silver;"|2 ||  || Milunka Lazarević, Verica Nedeljković, Katarina Jovanović-Blagojević|| 24½ || 
|-
| style="background:#cc9966;"|3 ||  || Edith Keller-Herrmann, Waltraud Nowarra, Eveline Kraatz || 21 || 
|-
| 4 ||  || Alexandra Nicolau, Margareta Teodorescu, Margareta Perevoznic || 18½ || 
|-
| 5 ||  || Venka Asenova, Antonia Ivanova, Paunka Todorova || 17½ || 
|-
| 6 ||  || Éva Karakas, Gyuláné Krizsán-Bilek, Judit Gombás || 17 || 
|-
| 7 ||  || Corry Vreeken-Bouwman, Fenny Heemskerk, Hendrika Timmer || 15½ || 
|-
| 8 ||  || Henrijeta Konarkowska-Sokolov, Krystyna Hołuj-Radzikowska, Mirosława Litmanowicz || 15 || 
|-
| 9 ||  || Gisela Kahn Gresser, Mary Bain || 12½ || 
|-
| 10 ||  || Friedl Rinder, Anneliese Brandler, Marianne Kulke || 10½ || 11 
|-
| 11 ||  || Ganginchugin Hulgana, Sandagdorj Handsuren || 10½ || 10
|-
| 12 ||  || Ingeborg Kattinger, Wilma Samt, Hilde Kasperowski || 8 || 
|-
| 13 ||  || Anne Marie Renoy-Chevrier, Madeleine Cauquil || 5 || 4
|-
| 14 ||  || Louise-Jeanne Loeffler, Elisabeth Cuypers, Simone Lancel || 5 || 4
|-
| 15 ||  || Peggy Steedman, Nancy Elder || 4½ || 
|}

Individual medals
 Board 1:  Nona Gaprindashvili 11½ / 12 = 95.8%
 Board 2:  Verica Nedeljković 12 / 12 = 100%
 Reserve Board:  Hendrika Timmer 6½/ 9 = 72.2%

References

External links
2nd Women's Chess Olympiad: Split 1963 OlimpBase

Women's Chess Olympiads
Olympiad w2
Chess Olympiad w2
Olympiad w2
Chess Olympiad w1
September 1963 sports events in Europe
October 1963 sports events in Europe